American poet John Ashbery (1927–2017) received numerous awards, nominations, grants, fellowships, and other honors in his lifetime. He was generally regarded as the most-honored poet of his generation and one of the most-honored American writers of any era.

He received his first award, the 92nd Street Y Discovery Prize for unpublished poets, in 1952. Four years later, W. H. Auden selected him as the winner of the Yale Series of Younger Poets Competition, resulting in the publication of his debut poetry collection Some Trees. His 1975 collection Self-Portrait in a Convex Mirror became the first book to win a Pulitzer Prize, a National Book Award, and a National Book Critics Circle Award. To date, Ashbery remains the only writer to attain the achievement, which has been called the "Triple Crown" of American literature.

Beyond prizes and awards, Ashbery was a recipient of several monetary grants and fellowships that provided crucial support for his literary ambitions and travel. As a Fulbright scholar, he moved to France in 1955 to study French poetry and teach. He continued to live in the country for nearly a decade thereafter. Years later, the people of France conferred several honors in recognition of his lifelong engagement with French poetry and culture, most notably by making him an officer of the national Legion of Honor. In 1985 he received a MacArthur Fellowship—an unconditional cash prize informally known as the "Genius Grant"—allowing him to quit his job as a professor and write poetry full-time. He also received two Guggenheim Fellowships and two grants from the National Endowment for the Arts. Poems by Ashbery were often anthologized among the year's best.

Ashbery had acquired a reputation as a prolific prize-winner by the early 1990s. According to James F. English's 2004 book The Economy of Prestige, Ashber had received more awards than any other poet in the world. English counted 45 awards for Ashbery, followed by Irish poet Seamus Heaney at 30 awards and fellow American poet Adrienne Rich at 25 awards. David Lehman observed that Ashbery also held a lead over the novelist John Updike, winner of 39 awards, and therefore Ashbery likely stood as the most-honored of any living American writer—at least in terms of sheer quantity of awards. Although he was considered a perennial contender for the Nobel Prize in Literature over the last three decades of his life—and almost certainly the leading candidate among American poets during that period—he never became a Nobel laureate.

Accolades for individual works

92Y Discovery Prize

The Discovery Prize is an award given to poets who have not yet published their debut book. It is given out annually by the 92nd Street Y (also called 92Y), a cultural and community center in Manhattan run by the Young Men's Hebrew Association (now called the Jewish Community Center).

Ashbery received the Discovery Prize on April 3, 1952, as the winner of what was then called the Poetry Center Introductions contest. He shared the award with Harvey Shapiro and Gray Burr. The contest that year had hundreds of competing applicants and was judged by John Malcolm Brinnin, Kimon Friar, and Richard Wilbur. It was Ashbery's first literary award. He gave a reading of sixteen poems at the award ceremony—his first since graduating college. When asked to judge the Discovery Prize competition in 2014, he replied, "I'll have to say yes, since the contest was the beginning of my poetry career, a mere 52 years ago."

ALA Notable Books
Since 1944, the American Library Association (ALA) has compiled annual lists of Notable Books for adults. The winners are selected by the Notable Books Council, a subgroup within the ALA's Reference and User Services Association (RUSA), which also makes other award decisions. The criteria, as described in 2012, are:

Books written by Ashbery have been listed three times: once in 1978 for Houseboat Days, again in 1982 for Shadow Train, and a final time in 2012 for his translation of the French poet Arthur Rimbaud's Illuminations.

  ! 
|-
  ! scope="row" | 1978
  | Houseboat Days
  | rowspan="3" | ALA Notable Book
  | 
  | style="text-align:center;"| 
|-
  ! scope="row" | 1982
  | Shadow Train
  | 
  | style="text-align:center;"| 
|-
  ! scope="row" | 2012
  | Illuminations
  | 
  | style="text-align:center;"| 
|}

"Best-of" anthologies
In general, Ashbery was among the top 25 most frequently anthologized American poets of the latter half of the 20th century. In most cases, literary anthologies either attempt to define a set of "canonical" works or collect writings united by a common characteristic such as historical time period, region, author identity, genre, etc. Although inclusion in such anthologies can be considered prestigious, they are not understood to be "prizes" or "awards" per se. The following anthologies were competitive selections of the previous year's "best" poetry, as judged by an editor or panel of editors.

Borestone Mountain Poetry Awards

The Borestone Mountain Poetry Awards were a nonprofit literary foundation and annual poetry anthology series released between 1949 and 1977. The Borestone Mountain Poetry Awards anthologies collected the editors' selections of the best original English-language poems of no more than 100 lines published the preceding year in literary magazines. After making an initial selection, the editors read poems with the names of the author and original publication removed and assigned scores. The authors of the three highest-scoring poems received cash prizes and were designated as First, Second, and Third place in the anthology.

Ashbery's poem "Soonest Mended", first published in The Paris Review and included in his collection The Double Day of Spring(1970), was chosen for Best Poems of 1969: Borestone Mountain Poetry Awards 1970. It did not receive one of the top three placements.

Pushcart Prize
Published annually since 1976, the Pushcart Prize anthologizes the best writing from independently published periodicals including poetry, fiction and nonfiction. Ashbery's poem "All Kinds of Caresses" appeared in The Pushcart Prize, II: Best of the Small Presses. It was nominated by the Chicago Review, the same journal in which it was first published. Ashbery was also a contributing editor for that volume and nominated Douglas Crase's "Cuylerville" and James Schuyler's "Song". Joan Murray and other Pushcart editors also selected the poem for The Pushcart Book of Poetry: The Best Poems From Three Decades of the Pushcart Prize(2006).

The Best American Poetry
The Best American Poetry series launched in 1988 and is edited by David Lehman. Each year, a different guest editor selects 75 of the year's best American poetry published the preceding year. Ashbery was the guest editor for the first volume, The Best American Poetry 1988, in which he selected his own "One Coat of Paint". Between 1989 and 2017, poems of his were chosen 20 times. Three of those poems were included again in The Best of the Best American Poetry 1988–1997, which compiled Harold Bloom's selections from the 750 poems in the first ten years of the series. His poem "Wakefulness", originally chosen in the 1998 volume, was selected by Robert Pinsky for The Best of the Best American Poetry: 25th Anniversary Edition(2013).

Anthologies related to other awards
Ashbery's debut collection Some Trees was chosen as the 52nd winner of the Yale Series of Younger Poets Competition and published by Yale University Press in 1956. Five poems from the book were subsequently included in The Yale Younger Poets Anthology, edited by George Bradley and published in 1998: "The Instruction Manual", "The Young Son", "Some Trees", "The Painter", and "The Pied Piper". Later, three poems from Some Trees—"A Boy", "Errors", and "Answering a Question in the Mountains"—were chosen for the series' 2019 centennial anthology Firsts: 100 Years of Yale Younger Poets, edited by Carl Phillips. See the section on the Yale Series of Younger Poets Prize below.

Six of Ashbery's poems were included in The Griffin Poetry Prize 2008 Anthology because his book Notes from the Air: Selected Later Poems was shortlisted for the international Griffin Poetry Prize. He ultimately won that year's international prize. See the section on the Griffin Prize below.

Bingham Poetry Prize
The Bingham Poetry Prize was an award given by the literary magazine Boston Book Review. Established in 1993, the Boston Book Review published ten issues annually until it ceased publication in 2000 and, around 1997–98, reportedly had the third-highest circulation of any American book review periodical. Along with the magazine's Fisk Fiction Prize and Rea Non-Fiction Prize, the Bingham Poetry Prize was an annual award to "celebrate excellent literary accomplishments" that had been published the previous year. Each of the three awards carried a cash prize of $1,000.

Ashbery was a co-winner of the Bingham Poetry Prize for The Mooring of Starting Out: The First Five Books of Poetry, a compilation of his early work. Judged by Jorie Graham, the 1998 prize was also awarded to Frank Bidart, who won for his collection Desire.

  ! 
|-
  ! scope="row" | 1998
  | The Mooring of Starting Out: The First Five Books of Poetry
  | The Bingham Poetry Prize
  | 
  | style="text-align:center;" | 
|}

Griffin Poetry Prize

The Griffin Poetry Prize is an annual Canadian literary award established in 2000 by the Griffin Trust for Excellence in Poetry "to serve and encourage excellence in poetry written in or translated into English anywhere in the world." A cash prize is split between winners in two categories: one Canadian and one international author.

Ashbery won the 2008 Griffin Poetry Prize for Notes from the Air: Selected Later Poems. A jury of George Bowering, James Lasdun, and Pura López Colomé selected the shortlist and judged the winner. The other shortlisted international titles, selected from a total of 509 submissions overall, were Ripple Effect: New and Selected Poems by Elaine Equi, The Complete Poetry: A Bilingual Edition by César Vallejo in a translation by Clayton Eshleman, and Selected Poems 1969–2005 by David Harsent.

Selections from the shortlisted books, including six poems from Notes from the Air, were anthologized in The Griffin Poetry Prize 2008 Anthology; see the section on anthologies above.

  ! 
|-
  ! scope="row" | 2008
  | Notes from the Air: Selected Later Poems
  | The Griffin Poetry Prize (International category)
  | 
  | style="text-align:center;" | 
|}

Longview Foundation Award

The Longview Foundation was an organization based in New York City; Harold Rosenberg was its program director. Longview Foundation Awards were selected by a panel of judges from a selection of poems published in independently published little magazines and collections. The award was accompanied by a $300 cash prize. The foundation first gave out awards in 1959 for poetry published in 1957 and 1958.

The second awards were announced in March 1960 for poetry published in 1959, though the announcement did not mention Ashbery. However, he did receive a Longview Foundation Award for two poems, "How Much Longer Will I Be Able to Inhabit the Divine Sepulcher ..." and "April Fool's Day", both of which had been published in Big Table Volume 1, Number 3 (1959). The judges were Saul Bellow, Louise Bogan, Charles Boni, Alfred Kazin, Thomas B. Hess, and Henri Peyre. According to Mark Ford, Ashbery received the prize in part due to advocacy from Donald Barthelme and Thomas Hess.

  ! 
|-
  ! scope="row" | 1960
  | Two poems from Big Table 3 (1959):
 "How Much Longer Will I Be Able to Inhabit the Divine Sepulcher ..."
 "April Fool's Day"
  | Longview Foundation Award
  | 
  | style="text-align:center;"| 
|}

Jerome J. Shestack Poetry Prize
Since 1984, The American Poetry Review has awarded the Jerome J. Shestack Poetry Prize to the best poems published by the journal in the preceding year. The award is named for Jerome J. Shestack, an attorney and human rights advocate who was also general counsel for the American Poetry Review. Ashbery was one of the first winners of the award for his long poem "A Wave", first published in the July–August 1983 issue. He received the top cash prize of $1,000; the other winners that year were Stephen Dobyns ($500) and Michael Burkard ($250). Ashbery won the award a second time in 1996 for fifteen poems in the January–February 1995 issue, which were subsequently included in his collection Can You Hear, Bird(1995). The year's other winner was Gerald Stern, and both poets received a cash prize of $1,000.

  ! 
|-
  ! scope="row" | 1984
  | "A Wave" (from the July–August 1983 issue of The American Poetry Review)
  | rowspan="2" | Jerome J. Shestack Poetry Prize
  | 
  | style="text-align:center;"| 
|-
  ! scope="row" | 1996
  | 
Fifteen poems from the January–February 1995 issue of The American Poetry Review:

 "Operators Are Standing By"
 "The Waiting Ceremony"
 "You Would Have Thought"
 "The Green Mummies"
 "Obedience School"

 "Chapter II, Book 35"
 "The Blot People"
 "Love in Boots"
 "Hegel"
 "My Name Is Dimitri"

 "In an Inchoate Place"
 "The Walkways"
 "Fascicle"
 "The Military Base"
 "Limited Liabilities"
  | 
  | style="text-align:center;"| 
|}

Lenore Marshall Poetry Prize
Ashbery was announced as the winner of the Lenore Marshall Poetry Prize in 1985 for A Wave. The award, given by The Nation magazine, came with a cash prize of $7,500 at that time. The judges who selected A Wave were John Hollander, Rika Lesser, and Dave Smith. In 2001, Your Name Here was a finalist for the award, which by then was jointly administered by The Nation and the Academy of American Poets. Elaine Equi, Ann Lauterbach, and Bob Perelman judged the competition that year, selecting Fanny Howe as the winner for her Selected Poems.

  ! 
|-
  ! scope="row" | 1985
  | A Wave
  | rowspan="2" | Lenore Marshall Poetry Prize 
  | 
  | style="text-align:center;" | 
|-
  ! scope="row" | 2001
  | Your Name Here
  | 
  | style="text-align:center;" | 
|}

Los Angeles Times Book Prize
Ashbery was twice nominated for the Los Angeles Times Book Prize for poetry: once in 1984 for A Wave and again in 1986 for Selected Poems. The poetry prize winners those years were The Maximus Poems(1984) by Charles Olson and Collected Poems, 1948–1984(1986) by Derek Walcott.

  ! 
|-
  ! scope="row" | 1984
  | A Wave
  | rowspan="2" | Los Angeles Times Book Award
  | 
  | style="text-align:center;" | 
|-
  ! scope="row" | 1986
  | Selected Poems
  | 
  | style="text-align:center;" | 
|}

National Book Award for Poetry

First presented by the National Book Committee in 1936, the National Book Awards are among the most prestigious American literary awards. The awards, currently administered by the National Book Foundation, have been organized by a variety of groups throughout their history. The National Book Award for Poetry has been bestowed annually since 1950, except for a hiatus between 1984 and 1990. Ashbery won the award once and was a finalist three times.

In 1967, the National Book Committee named Rivers and Mountains as a poetry finalist. It was selected by a judges panel of W. H. Auden, James Dickey, and Howard Nemerov. In 1976, Ashbery won the award—and its cash prize of $1,000—for Self-Portrait in a Convex Mirror. The poetry judges were Babette Deutsch (who was also the panel's chairperson), John Malcolm Brinnin, and James Scully. The awards were administered by the National Institute of Arts and Letters for the first time that year, following the surprise disappearance of the National Book Committee.

When Ashbery was a finalist in 1982 for Shadow Train, the awards were run by the Association of American Publishers and had been renamed the American Book Awards—a change introduced in 1980 that lasted until 1987, when they reverted to the former title. Ashbery received his fourth and final nomination for Where Shall I Wander in 2005, by which time the National Book Foundation coordinated the awards. As a finalist, Ashbery received a $1,000 cash prize and a bronze medal; winners received $10,000 and a bronze statuette.

  ! 
|-
  ! scope="row" | 1967
  | Rivers and Mountains
  | rowspan="2" | National Book Award for Poetry
  | 
  | style="text-align:center;" | 
|-
  ! scope="row" | 1976
  | Self-Portrait in a Convex Mirror
  | 
  | style="text-align:center;" | 
|-
  ! scope="row" | 1982
  | Shadow Train
  | National Book Award for Poetry (presented as the American Book Award for Poetry)
  | 
  | style="text-align:center;" | 
|-
  ! scope="row" | 2005
  | Where Shall I Wander
  | National Book Award for Poetry
  | 
  | style="text-align:center;" | 
|}

National Book Critics Circle Award

Ashbery won the inaugural National Book Critics Circle Award for Poetry and was nominated another four times. Self-Portrait in a Convex Mirror was announced as the award's first winner on January 8, 1976. The award is given by the National Book Critics Circle, an association of editors and critics founded in 1974 in New York City. According to Ashbery, the award itself was "almost invented" for him. In an interview with Mark Ford, Ashbery recalled an exchange reportedly sparked by a negative review for his Self-Portrait in The New York Review of Books:

The National Book Critics Circle nominated three more of his original collections: Houseboat Days in 1977, A Wave in 1984, and April Galleons in 1987. He was also announced as a finalist in 2008 for The Landscapist, his translation of Pierre Martory's French poetry collection.

  ! 
|-
  ! scope="row" | 1976
  | Self-Portrait in a Convex Mirror
  | rowspan="5" | National Book Critics Circle Award for Poetry
  | 
  | style="text-align:center;" | 
|-
  ! scope="row" | 1977
  | Houseboat Days
  | 
  | style="text-align:center;" | 
|-
  ! scope="row" | 1984
  | A Wave
  | 
  | style="text-align:center;" | 
|-
  ! scope="row" | 1987
  | April Galleons
  | 
  | style="text-align:center;" | 
|-
  ! scope="row" | 2008
  | The Landscapist
  | 
  | style="text-align:center;" | 
|}

New York Times Book Review accolades
The New York Times Book Review is a weekly literary supplement to The New York Times. Within the American publishing industry, it has long been considered one of the most influential and widely read publications. In addition to reviews, news, and other features, the New York Times Book Review has printed unranked lists of best books, including annual "Notable Books" lists in December, "Summer Reading" lists in May or June, and "Editors' Choice" articles highlighting recent recently released books. Books by Ashbery have been included on several of these lists.

Oxford-Weidenfeld Translation Prize

The annual Oxford-Weidenfeld Translation Prize is an award recognizing "book-length literary translations into English from any living European language." Funded by and named for George Weidenfeld, Baron Weidenfeld, the prize is administered by the New College, Queen's College, and St. Anne's College at the University of Oxford. As of 2012, the winner would receive £2,000.

Out of 102 submissions, Ashbery was shortlisted for his translation of the French poet Arthur Rimbaud's collection Illuminations. The prize went to Judith Landry for her translation of the Italian novel New Finnish Grammar by Diego Marani.

  ! 
|-
  ! scope="row" | 2012
  | Illuminations
  | Oxford-Weidenfeld Translation Prize
  | 
  | style="text-align:center;" | 
|}

Pegasus Award for Poetry Criticism
In 2013, the Poetry Foundation announced it would be accepting submissions for its new Pegasus Award for Poetry Criticism, to be awarded for the first time on June 9, 2014. The award contest accepts any book-length nonfiction work about poetry or the lives of poets published in the preceding year. Ashbery was named as a finalist for his Collected French Translations: Poetry and Collected French Translations: Prose, edited by Rosanne Wasserman and Eugene Richie. That year's Pegasus Award went to the University of California Press for two volumes of collected writings by Robert Duncan. The winner of the award received $7,500 and each of the five finalists received $1,000.

  ! 
|-
  ! scope="row" | 2014
  | Collected French Translations: Poetry and Collected French Translations: Prose
  | Pegasus Award for Poetry Criticism
  | 
  | style="text-align:center;" | 
|}

Poetry Book Society Recommended Translation
The London Poetry Book Society publishes a quarterly bulletin of its book choices, recommendations, and special commendations. In 2011, Carol Rumens said these designations have the prestige of a literary award and are "a milestone for poets, signalling achievement or progress." In Autumn 2008, Ashbery's translation of Pierre Martory's The Landscapist was chosen as the Poetry Book Society's Recommended Translation by selector Mimi Khalvati.

  ! 
|-
  ! scope="row" | 2008
  | The Landscapist
  | Poetry Book Society Recommended Translation
  | 
  | style="text-align:center;" | 
|}

Poetry magazine awards
Ashbery was a frequent contributor to Poetry and won several awards from the magazine for poems published in its pages. His first, in 1963, was the Harriet Monroe Memorial Prize of $100 for five poems in that year's June issue. That year's prize winners were decided by a panel of Wallace Fowlie, Joseph Wiley, and then-editor Henry Rago. Three years later, the same three judges awarded Ashbery the Union League Civic and Arts Foundation Poetry Prize of $100 for the poem "Fragment", published in February 1966. The prize was sponsored by the Union League Club of Chicago.

In 1974 he received the Frank O'Hara Prize, named in memory of his friend and fellow poet Frank O'Hara, who had died in 1966. The award and its $500 cash prize recognized poems from the November 1973, April 1974, and August 1974 issues, which included the title poem from Self-Portrait in a Convex Mirror and others that would appear in the same collection. He received the $300 Levinson Prize, named for the attorney Salmon Levinson and created by an endowment of his family, in 1977 for poems in the April and August issues. Two years later he received the first English-Speaking Union Prize, awarded by the Junior Board of the titular organization and valued at $1,000, for seven poems from July 1979.

  ! 
|-
  ! scope="row" | 1963
  | Five poems from the June 1963 issue:
 "A Blessing in Disguise"
 "If the Birds Knew"
 "Last Month"
 "The Recent Past"
 "Civilization and Its Discontents"
  | Harriet Monroe Memorial Prize
  | 
  | style="text-align:center;" | 
|-
  ! scope="row" | 1966
  | One poem from the February 1966 issue:
 "Fragment"
  | Union League Civic and Arts Foundation Poetry Prize
  | 
  | style="text-align:center;" | 
|-
  ! scope="row" | 1974
  | Five poems published in Poetry, 1973–74:
"As You Came from the Holy Land" (November 1973)
"A Man of Words" (November)
"Scheherazade" (November)
"Grand Galop" (April 1974)
"Self-Portrait in a Convex Mirror" (August)
  | Frank O'Hara Prize
  | 
  | style="text-align:center;" | 
|-
  ! scope="row" | 1977
  | Four poems published in Poetry, 1977:
 "Syringa" (April)
 "Blue Sonata" (April)
 "The Ice-Cream Wars" (April)
 "Fantasia on 'The Nut-Brown Maid'" (August)
  | Levinson Prize
  | 
  | style="text-align:center;" | 
|-
  ! scope="row" | 1979
  | Seven poems published in the July 1979 issue:
 "Late Echo"
 "Train Rising Out of the Station"
 "Not Only / But Also"
 "Many Wagons Ago"
 "The Sun"
 "Five Pedantic Pieces"
 "Flowering Death"
  | The English-Speaking Union Prize
  | 
  | style="text-align:center;" | 
|}

Pulitzer Prize for Poetry

The Pulitzer Prizes have been administered by Columbia University since 1917 and are currently awarded in 21 categories for accomplishments in journalism, literature, and music. Columbia first awarded an informal Poetry Prize in 1918 and formally introduced the Pulitzer Prize for Poetry in 1922. The winner of a Pulitzer Prize for Poetry receives a certificate and a cash prize. Although the value of the cash prize has steadily increased throughout the years, it has been considered fairly low within the field of literary awards throughout most of its history. However, the award's high public prestige and associated rise in sales have outpaced other awards with higher cash prizes.

Self-Portrait in a Convex Mirror won the 1976 Pulitzer Prize for Poetry. At that time, the award's cash prize was $1,000. The book was unanimously selected by a jury of Anthony Hecht, Richard Howard, and Mark Strand, who also shortlisted Buried City by Howard Moss, The Western Approaches by Howard Nemerov, and Tales Told by Fathers by John Hollander. In the jury's report to the Pulitzer Advisory Board, Hecht wrote:

Ashbery was a finalist in 1993 for Hotel Lautréamont, nominated by a jury of Frank Bidart, Bonnie Costello, and Charles Wright. Louise Glück won that year for The Wild Iris, while James Merrill's Selected Poems 1946–1985 was also nominated.

  ! 
|-
  ! scope="row" | 1976
  | Self-Portrait in a Convex Mirror
  | rowspan="2" | Pulitzer Prize for Poetry
  | 
  | style="text-align:center;" | 
|-
  ! scope="row" | 1993
  | Hotel Lautréamont
  | 
  | style="text-align:center;" | 
|}

Shelley Memorial Award
Named for the English Romantic poet Percy Bysshe Shelley (1792–1822), the Shelley Memorial Award was established in 1929. It is administered by the Poetry Society of America (PSA) and awarded on the basis of "genius and need". The three-person jury is appointed by the president (chancellor) of the University of California, Berkeley, the president of Radcliffe College, and the PSA board of directors.

In 1973, Ashbery and Richard Wilbur were both awarded the Shelley Memorial Award. He received a cash prize of $1,800. The award was granted in recognition of his collection Three Poems(1972).

  ! 
|-
  ! scope="row" | 1973
  | Three Poems
  | Shelley Memorial Award
  | 
  | style="text-align:center;"| 
|}

SWR-Bestenliste
Südwestrundfunk (SWR) is a German public broadcasting corporation with television and radio stations. SWR's predecessor Südwestfunk (SWF) began the Bestenliste in 1976, when it was conceived as an alternative to Der Spiegels strictly sales-based booklist.

German translations of Ashbery's poetry have appeared on the Bestenliste twice. Ein weltgewandtes Land, a bilingual edition of the collection A Worldly Country with translations by multiple German poets, ranked in first place on the December 2010 list with 69 points.

Yale Series of Younger Poets Prize

Established in 1919, the Yale Series of Younger Poets Competition is the longest-running poetry prize in the United States. It began as a competition to recognize undergraduate poets at Yale University before expanding to accept any poets under the age of 30 (and later, 40) who had not yet published their first book. Each year, Yale University Press publishes the winner's debut book of poetry.

The preliminary round of the contest is judged by a team of editors, mostly graduate students, who pass on their recommendations to an editor selected by the board of Yale University Press. The editor is typically a leading figure in poetry who is not necessarily otherwise associated with Yale. W. H. Auden judged the competition between 1946 and 1958, a run considered to be the best in the competition's history due to the high number of winners who went on to acclaimed and noteworthy careers in poetry. Alongside Ashbery, some of the highly regarded winners selected by Auden include James Wright, Adrienne Rich, W. S. Merwin, and John Hollander.

Ashbery won the 1955 Younger Poets Competition, but only following a complicated and somewhat unfavorable process. Both he and Frank O'Hara, his friend and a fellow Harvard alumnus, were eliminated by the first round judges. However, Auden found himself dissatisfied with all of the twelve manuscripts that he had been given. He asked Ashbery and O'Hara to resubmit their poems directly to him and, a week later, decided he preferred Ashbery's submission. He named Ashbery the winner despite his own personal reservations about the avant-garde style and influence from surrealism in Ashbery's poetry, which he found alienating and often nonsensical. Ashbery's debut poetry collection, Some Trees, was published in 1956 with a foreword by Auden.

Poems from Some Trees have been subsequently included in two anthologies related to the Younger Poets series; see the section on "best-of" anthologies above.

  ! 
|-
  ! scope="row" | 1955
  | Some Trees
  | Yale Series of Younger Poets Prize
  | 
  | style="text-align:center;"| 
|}

Grants and fellowships
Ashbery received several grants and fellowships that provided monetary support for his creative output as a writer. The amount of money he received is provided, if known; if not, in some cases an approximate amount or possible range is given based on other sources describing the award.

Fulbright Program

Hoping to live in France, Ashbery applied for the Fulbright Program multiple times starting in 1950. He was rejected five times. However, he was accepted into the program in 1955 after an initial rejection because another applicant decided to withdraw. He lived in Montpellier and translated French poetry. As part of his Fulbright project, he translated works by Jules Supervielle, Paul Éluard, and Francis Ponge, which much later appeared in his Collected French Translations. His Fulbright was extended for a second year, during which he taught American studies in Rennes. After the grant expired, he moved to Paris and lived there until 1965.

Poets' Foundation
The Poets' Foundation—not to be confused with the Chicago-based Poetry Foundation—was an anonymously funded organization in New York. Ashbery received two grants from the Poets' Foundation: one in 1960, the other in 1964. The amounts Ashbery received from the foundation are not publicly known; other poets reportedly received grants ranging from $500 to $1,500 in the early-to-mid 1960s.

Ingram Merrill Foundation
American poet James Merrill established the Ingram Merrill Foundation in the 1950s. Merrill was a son of businessman Charles E. Merrill, who co-founded the investment and wealth management company Merrill Lynch. After the deaths of both his father and mother in 1956, Merrill received a substantial inheritance. He used the money to fund his own creative endeavors and to create the foundation, which provided grants to writers and artists until its dissolution in 1996. Though Merrill was a foundation board member, the foundation ostensibly made its grant-making decisions on an independent basis without his influence. He relied on this formal separation from the foundation to preserve normal social relations with other artists; he did not want to appear to be granting favors to friends, or to put others in the awkward position of personally asking him for funding. However, in practice Merrill retained final authority over the foundation's actions. He relied on the advice of colleagues like John Hollander and Irma Brandeis .

Ashbery received grants from the Ingram Merrill Foundation in 1962 and 1972. It is not known how much money Ashbery received from the foundation, but its typical grant sizes ranged from about $4,000 to $6,000.

Guggenheim Fellowships

Guggenheim Fellowships, disbursed by the John Simon Guggenheim Memorial Foundation since 1925, are grants intended "to help provide Fellows with blocks of time in which they can work with as much creative freedom as possible." Individuals are selected for fellowships through an application process. The amount of a grant varies depending on the foundation's budget, the scope of the applicant's creative project, and the extent of other financial resources available to the fellow.

Starting in 1955, Ashbery applied for a Guggenheim Fellowship eleven times. He was named a fellow two times—first in 1967, then in 1973. While the amounts of money he received through the program are not publicly known, the program's average grant sizes in those years were $7,430 and $11,252, respectively. He used the proceeds of his first fellowship to travel to Europe in 1968, visiting Pierre Martory in Paris then Switzerland and Italy with his mother. The second fellowship allowed him to delay taking a job teaching at Brooklyn College until 1974 so he could focus on writing poetry in the meantime. His poetry collections The Double Dream of Spring(1970) and Self-Portrait in a Convex Mirror(1975) include notes of acknowledgement to the Guggenheim Foundation.

National Endowment for the Arts (NEA)

In fiscal year 1969, he received a publication award of $500 from the National Endowment for the Arts (NEA). The award was given in recognition of his poem "Spring Day", first published in a 1967 issue of The Paris Review, and resulted in the poem's inclusion in The American Literary Anthology, Volume 2. Vance Bourjaily, Robert Duncan, Albert Guerard, Mark Harris, Philip Roth, Anne Sexton, Roger Shattuck, John Simon, and Louis Simpson.

In 1975, he applied for a Composer–Librettist grant from the NEA along with the modernist composer Elliott Carter. Their collaboration resulted in the musical piece Syringa, set to Ashbery's poem of the same name and several texts in Greek. Although Ashbery wrote several original libretti for Carter, the composer was inspired by the previously published "Syringa" and chose to use it instead. As such, Ashbery did not ultimately contribute new writing to the composition. Nevertheless, his grant—in the amount of $4,350—was not revoked.

Rockefeller Foundation

The Rockefeller Foundation is a large American private foundation. In 1971, it launched a yearly program of writing grants for a "playwright-in-residence" program, pairing a writer together with a theater with the goal of staging an original production. Eight or nine playwrights were chosen each year based on nominations taken from theaters and from the panel of judges followed by deliberation of the judges; applications were not accepted. Each playwright would receive $8,500 outright with an additional $500 for relocation expenses, while each designated theater would receive $4,000. There were little to no conditions placed upon receipt of the grant—according to The New York Times, one grant-winning playwright used the money to purchase a Ferrari sports car.

Although best known for poetry, Ashbery was also involved in theater early in his career and wrote several experimental plays, most of which were published together in the 1978 book Three Plays. He had largely abandoned dramatic writing by the time his first poetry collection was published in 1956. In an October 1978 interview, he described an untitled dramatic "work-in-progress" of about 100 pages that he had been developing, on and off, for several years. However, his final new play was To the Mill, published in 1960 as part of The Hasty Papers magazine edited by Alfred Leslie. It is not clear what became of the "work-in-progress".

Jack Larson, an actor and writer, nominated Ashbery and two others for the Rockefeller Foundation's playwright-in-residence program in 1978. In December 1978, the Rockefeller Foundation announced Ashbery and eight playwrights would receive grants under the program, though he was the only one listed without a paired theater. The New York Times announced the grant awards three months later, but still listed Ashbery only as "theater to be determined". It does not seem to be the case that he ultimately worked with a theater under the "playwright-in-residence" program, but he did receive the grant.

MacArthur Fellowship

In 1985, the MacArthur Foundation named Ashbery as one of 25 new MacArthur Fellows. Colloquially known as the "genius" grant, the fellowship is given to "outstandingly talented and creative people" so that they may "pursue whatever they believe is important and relevant", without conditions or limitations on how they spend the grant money. At the time, each fellow received between $155,000 and $300,000 over the course of five years, with higher value based on age. Between 1985 and 1990, Ashbery received $272,000, or $54,400 a year. Because of the MacArthur Fellowship, he was able to quit his jobs as a professor at Brooklyn College and as an art critic at Newsweek.

Wallace Stevens fellowship
The Wallace Stevens fellowship, named for American poet Wallace Stevens, was a program of the Timothy Dwight College at Yale University. It was established in 1976 by an anonymous donation from a fellow from the college. An annual program, the fellowship invited a prominent poet to come to the college and give readings of their work. The first Wallace Stevens fellow was Richard Eberhart, who was in residence at the college at the time. Ashbery was appointed to the fellowship in 1985.

Honors for cumulative or lifetime achievement
The following awards and honors were bestowed in recognition of Ashbery as an individual, either for lifetime achievement or the cumulative sum of his literary career and oeuvre.

Academic honors
Ashbery received several honors from universities and academic institutions.

Honorary degrees
Ashbery completed his formal education in 1951 with an M.A. at Columbia. He briefly considered going for a PhD, even beginning work on a dissertation about the life of French poet Raymond Roussel, but abandoned the project before completion.

While the M.A. was the highest degree he attained through schooling, he received honorary degrees at the DLitt (Doctor of Letters) level from the following universities and colleges:

Accademia dei Lincei
In 2006, Ashbery was elected a foreign member of the Italian Accademia dei Lincei in Rome. He had previously received its prestigious Antonio Feltrinelli International Prize; see the section on the Feltrinelli Prize below.

Bard College

Bard College is a private liberal arts college in Annandale-on-Hudson, New York. Ashbery—who was appointed as the Charles P. Stevenson, Jr., Professor of Languages and Literature at Bard in 1990—received several honors from the college:

In 1983, Ashbery was named the winner of Bard's Charles Flint Kellogg Award in Arts and Letters. The annual award recognizes a person who has made "a significant contribution to the American artistic or literary heritage."
Since 1995, the college has a recurrent reading event called the John Ashbery Poetry Series named in his honor.
At the occasion of the poet's 80th birthday in 2007, Ann Lauterbach held a weekend-long celebration at the college and the college's biennial literary journal Conjunctions dedicated a "special birthday anthology" issue to him. The issue, edited by Peter Gizzi and Bradford Morrow, featured personal essays from writers responding to Ashbery's poetry and reprinted some of his rare early writings.

Brandeis University

The Creative Arts Awards of Brandeis University in Waltham, Massachusetts recognizes "active American artists" with honors in three categories: the Creative Arts Medal, for lifetime achievement; the Creative Arts Citation, for "mid-career" achievement; and the Special Award for Notable Achievement in the Creative Arts, for an artist who has made "singular cultural contributions".

In May 1989, Ashbery received the Creative Arts Medal for Poetry at the 33rd Creative Arts Awards. The ceremony took place at the Guggenheim Museum in New York. The Brandeis Review said he was "credited with creating the most original and influential poetic mode of our time." Other medalists that year were Louise Bourgeois for sculpture, Jonas Mekas for film, Mel Powell for music.

Deerfield Academy
In 1984, Ashbery received the Heritage Award from the Deerfield Academy Alumni Association. He began attending the Massachusetts college-preparatory boarding school in 1943, published poetry in its student newspaper, The Deerfield Scroll, and graduated in 1945. Each year, the Heritage Award recognizes "a Deerfield alumnus or alumna whose professional and personal achievements represent a special contribution to the betterment of society." Other noteworthy recipients have included diplomat Rick Barton, meteorologist Kerry Emanuel, physician Caldwell Esselstyn, architect Hugh Hardy, writer and television producer Budd Schulberg, and executive Alan Hassenfeld.

Harvard University

Ashbery received several honors from his undergraduate alma mater, Harvard, and from organizations related to the school:

In 1979, he was named the Phi Beta Kappa Poet at Harvard and was inducted as a member. Founded as a fraternity in 1776, Phi Beta Kappa (ΦΒΚ) is an academic honor society with chapters throughout the United States. Its Harvard chapter, chartered in 1779, was the longest-running chapter when it merged into a broader Massachusetts chapter in 1995. Chosen annually, the Phi Beta Kappa poet gives a reading during commencement week events; other Phi Beta Kappa poets at Harvard have included W. H. Auden, Robert Frost, Henry Wadsworth Longfellow, Robert Lowell, and Wallace Stevens. Ashbery later judged the first Phi Beta Kappa poetry competition in 2001, awarding a $10,000 prize and bronze medal to Kenneth Koch from a field of 200 applicants.
Ashbery was selected to give the Charles Eliot Norton Lecture for the 1989–90 academic year. Named for Charles Eliot Norton, the annual lecture series on poetry—defined broadly enough to include poetic expressions like music and architecture—is considered one of the most highly prestigious of the hundreds at Harvard. Each of his six lectures surveyed the work of an under-appreciated "minor" poet from whom he had taken inspiration: they were John Clare, Thomas Lovell Beddoes, Raymond Roussel, John Wheelwright, Laura Riding, and David Schubert. These lectures were later published by Harvard University Press in the book Other Traditions(2000).
The Signet Society is an exclusive literary society at Harvard. Ashbery joined as an undergraduate, completing his initiation by performing an original Henry James parody titled "Return of the Screw". Other noteworthy members who pursued poetry include James Agee, Conrad Aiken, T. S. Eliot, and John Updike. The Signet Society Medal for Achievement in the Arts has been awarded on an annual basis since 1937. Ashbery was named a Signet Medalist in 2001. He was subsequently named the honorary poet of the Signet Society Annual Dinner in 2006.
In 2009, Ashbery received the Harvard Arts Medal at that year's Arts First festival at the university. According to Harvard Magazine, the award "celebrates alumni and faculty members whose excellence in the arts has served education or the public good." After an introduction by fellow Harvard alum John Lithgow, Ashbery discussed his work with scholar Daniel Chiasson and then received the medal from the university president, Drew Gilpin Faust.

New York University

In May 2011, the New York University Center for French Civilization and Culture conferred its Medal of Honor to Ashbery.

Pasadena City College
In 1985, Ashbery was named the Poet of the Year at Pasadena City College, a public community college in Pasadena, California. Since 1975, the Poet of the Year designation has been made by the college's literary journal Inscape.

Ambassador Book Award
In 2008, Ashbery received an Ambassador Book Award for Lifetime Achievement from the English-Speaking Union of the United States. He was recognized in part for his recently published book Notes from the Air: Selected Later Poems.

America Award in Literature
The America Award in Literature has been presented annually by Douglas Messerli's Los Angeles-based publishing company Green Integer since 1994. Considered an alternative to the Nobel Prize in Literature, it has been decided by a rotating panel that has included Messerli, Will Alexander, Luigi Ballerini, Charles Bernstein, Peter Constantine, Peter Glassgold, Deborah Meadows, Martin Nakell, John O'Brien, Marjorie Perloff, Dennis Phillips, Joe Ross, Jerome Rothenberg, Paul Vangelisti, and Mac Wellman. Ashbery received the award in 2008.

American Academy of Achievement Golden Plate
The American Academy of Achievement presents the Golden Plate to about 25 individuals at its annual International Achievement Summit. Launched in 1961, the award is given in recognition of achievement in one of five categories: the arts, public service, science & exploration, business, and sports. Ashbery received a Golden Plate in 1987. He was the second poet to receive the award, following Theodore Roethke.

American Academy of Arts and Letters Gold Medal for Poetry
Every year since 1909, the American Academy of Arts and Letters has awarded two of its Gold Medals recognizing lifetime achievement, rotating between the following paired categories: "Belles Lettres and Criticism" and "Painting"; "Biography" and "Music"; "Fiction" and "Sculpture"; "History" and "Architecture (including Landscape Architecture)"; "Poetry" and "Music"; and "Drama" and "Graphic Art". Ashbery received the gold medal for Poetry at a ceremony in Harlem on May 21, 1997, before an audience of 700. The other gold medal recipient that year was the composer Gunther Schuller.

Antonio Feltrinelli International Prize
The Feltrinelli Prize is an annual award given by the Italian Accademia dei Lincei in Rome. The award rotates each year to recognize achievement within one of a variety of categories, which include literature, arts, and sciences. In 1992, Ashbery became the first poet to win the Feltrinelli Prize in 15 years. He received a cash prize in Italian lire of ₤200 million, which at the exchange rate of the time was worth about $150,000.

Best of Brooklyn ("BoBi") Award
Since 2007, the annual Brooklyn Book Festival has presented its Best of Brooklyn (or "BoBi") Award to "an author whose body of work exemplifies or speaks to the spirit of Brooklyn." Ashbery received the award in 2010. He also read poetry and spoke on a panel with the first "BoBi" winner, Paul Auster.

Bollingen Prize
First awarded in 1949, the Bollingen Prize has been announced biennially since 1963. It is awarded by the Yale University Library to a living American poet, or poets, in recognition of either "the best collection published in that period, or for a body of poetry written over several years." Both Ashbery and Fred Chappell received the Bollingen Prize in 1985. Each poet received $2,500. They were chosen by a jury that included Annie Dillard, Richard Howard, and Louis D. Rubin Jr.

According to some recent sources, including the Flow Chart Foundation and the Poetry Foundation website's biography of Ashbery, he received the Bollingen Prize for his collection A Wave. However, The Yale University Library Gazette did not mention A Wave in its announcement and instead cited the two poets "for their body of work." Contemporaneous sources reporting on the Bollingen announcement, such as The New York Times and Poetry magazine, also described it as a cumulative award recognizing his work published to date and did not mention A Wave.

Common Wealth Award for Literature
The Common Wealth Award of Distinguished Service recognizes accomplished individuals in eight fields: dramatic arts, government, invention, literature, mass communications, public service, science, and sociology. Winners receive a cash prize and a trophy. The awards are funded by the Common Wealth Trust, established by the estate of Ralph Hayes. The award is currently managed by PNC Financial Services, but was overseen by the Bank of Delaware when Ashbery won. The literature category is judged and administered by the Modern Language Association (MLA).

Ashbery received the Common Wealth Award in Literature on December 28, 1986, at the MLA's annual convention in New York City. The cash prize that year was $11,000. Ashbery also received an engraved trophy. The MLA jury that selected Ashbery included Walter Scott Achtert, Phyllis Franklin, Winfred P. Lehmann, J. Hillis Miller, and Barbara Herrnstein Smith.

French honors

Ashbery had a deep, lifelong engagement with French poetry and received several notable French honors. In 1993, the French Ministry of Culture inducted him as a Knight of the Order of Arts and Letters (Chevalier de l'Ordre des Arts et des Lettres). The Minister of Culture, Jack Lang, bestowed the honor to Ashbery in Paris at the home of Harry Mathews. In 2002, he was inducted into the Legion of Honour as an Officer (Officier).

Grand Prix des Biennales Internationales de Poésie
In 1996, Ashbery won the Grand Prix des Biennales Internationales de Poésie (the "Grand Prize of the International Poetry Biennials") from the Maison Internationale de la Poésie (the "International House of Poetry") in Brussels, Belgium. Ashbery was the first English-language poet to receive the prize, which is given once every two years to "crown the published work of a living poet, whatever his nationality may be."

Hadada Award
The Paris Reviews Hadada Award—named for the hadada ibis, an African bird that was a favorite of founding editor George Plimpton—is presented to "a distinguished member of the writing community who has made a strong and unique contribution to literature" at the magazine's annual Spring Revel. Ashbey received the prize in 2009.

Horst Bienek Prize for Poetry
The Horst Bienek Prize for Poetry (Horst-Bienek-Preis für Lyrik) is an international literary award of the Bavarian Academy of Fine Arts (Bayerische Akademie der Schönen Künste) in Munich, Germany. It is named for Horst Bienek, a German poet whose estate provided for the award following his death on December 7, 1990. It is presented on a day close to the anniversary of Bienek's death, initially on an annual basis but biannually since 2003. Ashbery received the inaugural Horst Bienek Prize in December 1991.

National Arts Club Medal of Honor for Literary Achievement
Founded in New York in 1898, the National Arts Club is a private organization with a mission "to stimulate, foster, and promote public interest in the arts and to educate the American people in the fine arts." Since 1968, the National Arts Club has presented its Medal of Honor for Literary Achievement at an annual gala. Ashbery received the Medal of Honor on May 5, 2014, at an event with tributes by the Poetry Foundation's then-president Robert Polito, Irish poet Paul Muldoon, author Jed Perl, and the rock musician and author Patti Smith.

National Book Foundation Medal for Distinguished Contribution to American Letters

Since 1988, the National Book Foundation has presented a lifetime achievement award called the Medal for Distinguished Contribution to American Letters. The winner is chosen by the foundation's board of directors and the medal is presented at the annual National Book Award ceremony. It comes with a $10,000 cash prize and is awarded to "a person who has enriched our literary heritage over a life of service, or a corpus of work."

The National Book Foundation announced in September 2011 that Ashbery won that year's Medal for Distinguished Contribution. He received the prize at the 62nd National Book Awards Ceremony and Benefit Dinner on November 16, 2011, at the high-end venue Cipriani Wall Street in the Financial District of Manhattan. The event was hosted by actor John Lithgow, who had previously awarded Ashbery the Harvard Arts Medal in 2009. Ann Lauterbach provided an introduction for Ashbery, during which she briefly alluded to the Occupy Wall Street protests happening nearby. In his acceptance speech, Ashbery described the "pleasure of writing" and his lifelong interest in "difficult" poetry.

National Humanities Medal

The National Humanities Medal is an annual award of the United States federal government honoring "individuals or groups whose work has deepened the nation's understanding of the humanities and broadened our citizens' engagement with history, literature, languages, philosophy, and other humanities subjects." Up to 12 National Humanities Medals can be awarded each year, with recipients selected by the president in consultation with the National Endowment for the Humanities (NEH).

Ashbery was one of eight recipients of the 2011 National Humanities Medal, who were announced alongside seven recipients of the National Medal of Arts on February 10, 2012. Another poet, Rita Dove, received a National Medal of Arts that same year. In a summary of Ashbery's career and accomplishments at NEH.gov, Steve Moyer wrote:

President Barack Obama awarded the medals in a ceremony at the East Room of the White House on February 13, 2012. In his opening remarks, Obama quoted from Emily Dickinson's poem "I dwell in possibility". First Lady Michelle Obama was also present. Writing about the event for the Poetry Society of America, Darrel Alejandro Holnes remarked that Ashbery appeared "cordial and visibly joyful" as he received his medal.

New York honors
Ashbery received several awards from public and nonprofit entities in New York.

New York State Poet
Ashbery served as New York State's seventh Poet Laureate (officially the "State Poet") from 2001 to 2003. The position was created by state statute in 1985, with term lengths of two years. New York State Poets receive the Walt Whitman Citation of Merit and a $10,000 honorarium. The New York State Writers Institute at the University at Albany, SUNY selected Ashbery for the award, which was conferred on January 22, 2001. Kurt Vonnegut became the New York State Author at the same ceremony, receiving the Edith Wharton Citation of Merit for Fiction Writers.

Columbia County Special Citation for Literature
In 2001, the Columbia County Council on the Arts gave the poet a Special Citation for Literature. He had lived in the county since 1978, when he purchased a home in Hudson.

New York City honors

In 1983, he received a Mayor's Award of Honor for Arts and Culture from the city's Department of Cultural Affairs. Mayor's Awards for Arts and Culture were given most years between 1976 and 1994 and were revived in 2004. Ashbery accepted the award in a ceremony  at Gracie Mansion, presented by Mayor Ed Koch, to celebrate the 50th anniversary of the Academy of American Poets. Other recipients of the award that year were Merce Cunningham, Brendan Gill, Alberta Hunter, David Katz, LuEsther Mertz, Tina Ramirez, Vivian Robinson, Arthur Ross, Rudolf Serkin, Maureen Stapleton, and Sol Steinberg.

In 2006, the New York City Council proclaimed April 7 "John Ashbery Day", in conjunction with a three-day John Ashbery Festival held at The New School.

In 2013, Ashbery was announced as the winner in the poetry category of the second annual NYC Literary Honors, established under Mayor Michael Bloomberg's administration. Other honorees that year included Toni Morrison, Calvin Trillin, Jules Feiffer, Morton L. Janklow, and Lynn Nesbit. The awards were presented during a ceremony at Gracie Mansion, with Ashbery and the other winners giving selected readings. The honorees were selected by Cultural Affairs Commissioner Kate D. Levin, New York City Schools Chancellor Dennis Walcott, and heads of the New York Public Library system.

New York Public Library and library organizations
On April 22, 1977, Ashbery received the annual literary award of the nonprofit Friends of the Library organization in Rochester, his birthplace. It was his first lifetime achievement award.

In 1984, he received the New York Public Library's Literary Lion award. The library launched the award—more recently called the Library Lion—in 1981. These awards, given in the form of a lion-head medallion, have been conferred annually at black tie fundraising events benefitting the library. Alongside Ashbery there were 21 other writers who received the award on November 12, 1984, during an event that raised $250,000.

Ashbery was inducted into the New York State Writers Hall of Fame in 2011, the institution's second year, at the Empire State Book Festival Gala in Albany. The Hall of Fame is a project of the New York Library Association and the New York Council for the Humanities. Ashbery and Paula Fox were the two living writers to join the Hall of Fame that year;  the others were Willa Cather, Julia de Burgos, Ralph Ellison, Lorraine Hansberry, Madeleine L'Engle, Herman Melville, and Dorothy Parker.

Premio Napoli Special Prize
The  ("Naples Prize") is an annual Italian literary award recognizing Italian and international literature. The prize has been administered by the Fondazione Premio Napoli ("Naples Prize Foundation") since 1960, when it was established by the government of Italy.

In 2009, the Fondazione Premio Napoli recognized Ashbery with a special prize for career achievement in world literature. The prize also recognized the recent publication of Un mondo che non può essere migliore: Poesie scelte 1956–2007, an Italian-language collection of selected poems translated by Moira Egan, Damiano Abeni, and Joseph Harrison. The special prize for Italian literature went to Antonio Moresco. As part of the Premio Napoli events in October, Ashbery called in from New York for a conversation with Moresco, presented for a live audience at the Royal Palace of Naples and broadcast on the radio by RAI.

In December, Ashbery received the award in-person during a ceremony hosted by the Italian Academy at Columbia University. Attendees included Fondazione Napoli president  and several members of the Columbia faculty. Charles Simic, who had received the main international Premio Napoli that year, presented Ashbery with a plaque. During his acceptance speech Ashbery read from "And You Know", a poem written about his first travels through Europe that recounts his impressions of Naples.

Raymond Roussel Society Medal

As a great admirer of avant-garde French writer Raymond Roussel (1877–1933), Ashbery was a founding member of the Raymond Roussel Society in 2016. The following June, he became the first recipient of the Raymond Roussel Society Medal for "rediscovering and spreading awareness of Raymond Roussel in the United States of America."

Joan Bofill-Amargós, president of the Raymond Roussel Society, designed the medal itself: a gold-plated silver medallion which, as a reference to an event from Roussel's life, contained a cookie in the shape of a five-pointed star inside. Ashbery's poor health did not permit him to leave his home, so Bofill-Amargós personally delivered it to him at his home in Hudson. The next day, Trevor Winkfield publicly accepted the medal on Ashbery's behalf during an event held at the Instituto Cervantes in New York.

Robert Creeley Award

The Robert Creeley Foundation was formed in 2001 in Acton, Massachusetts to benefit the town's local library, schools, and community at large. It was formed by poets Robert Clawson and Robert Creeley, the foundation's namesake and the first recipient of its Robert Creeley Award. The foundation presented the award every year to an "internationally renowned poet", who would be invited to Acton to offer free public readings, give presentations at local schools, and donate signed copies of their books to the collection of the Acton Memorial Library. Creeley and Ashbery had attended Harvard together and remained friends long afterward.

Ashbery won the Robert Creeley Award in spring 2008, three years after Creeley's death. The award was presented by Robert's widow Pen Creeley. He gave three poetry readings: the first at R. J. Grey Junior High School, another the following day at Acton-Boxborough Regional High School, and at the Memorial Library. More than 800 audience members, in total, attended these events. Local students Peter Boskey and Michael Bottari opened for Ashbery with readings of their original poems. They were the first winners of the foundation's Helen Creeley Student Poetry Prize, a contest open to submissions from area high schoolers and named for Robert's sister, who was also a poet.

Robert Frost Medal

The Robert Frost Medal is a lifetime achievement award of the Poetry Society of America (PSA). Introduced in 1930 as the PSA's "Gold Medal", it was renamed after poet Robert Frost and turned into an annual award in 1984. Since 1995, the Frost Medal winner is expected to give a speech at the PSA's Annual Awards Ceremony known as the Robert Frost Lecture, which includes readings of their poetry.

Ashbery won the Frost Medal in 1995. As such, he delivered the first Frost Lecture. The text of his lecture was published for the first time in his 2004 collection Selected Prose.

Ruth Lilly Poetry Prize
The Ruth Lilly Poetry Prize was established in 1986 by philanthropist Ruth Lilly as an annual prize to a poet "whose lifetime accomplishments warrant extraordinary recognition." Throughout its history it has been among the most substantial cash prizes for a literary award in the United States; as of 2019, its value is $100,000. The prize was initially administered by the Modern Poetry Association and the American Council for the Arts and is currently administered by the Poetry Foundation. The Modern Poetry Association was also the publisher of Poetry magazine prior to the Poetry Foundation.

Ashbery was announced as the winner of the 1992 Ruth Lilly Poetry Prize on May 5. Poetry ran the announcement in its July issue. The prize money that year was $25,000, which he told The New York Times was "certainly welcome but hardly enough to quit my job and retire." However, he said the prestige "makes one feel better. It temporarily allays one's doubts about one's work that you think you've conquered but that eventually come creeping back."

Wallace Stevens Award
The Wallace Stevens Award is a lifetime achievement prize from the Academy of American Poets for "outstanding and proven mastery in the art of poetry." The award carries one of the largest cash prizes for a literary award, worth $100,000 as of 2019. Ashbery won the award in Fall 2001, receiving a cash prize of $150,000. The selection committee included Charles Bernstein, Susan Howe, Harryette Mullen, Geoffrey O'Brien, and Cole Swenson.

Miscellaneous honors

The following are miscellaneous honors and distinctions which do not squarely fit into any of the other categories:
In 1980, he was elected as a member of the American Academy of Arts and Letters.
In 1983, he was elected as a member of the American Academy of Arts and Sciences.
In 1988, he was elected as a chancellor of the Academy of American Poets. He retained the position until his term expired at the end of 1999, in the midst of a restructuring and the introduction of a new rotation schedule to help encourage greater diversity and less elitism in the organization.
From April 6–8, 2006, The New School hosted a John Ashbery Festival featuring poetry readings and discussions. Ashbery gave a reading on the second day. The festival was organized by David Lehman. In the lead-up to the festival, Lehman also coordinated to have the New York City Council proclaim April 7 as John Ashbery Day. See the section on New York City honors above.
Also in 2006, the University of Massachusetts Amherst dedicated its Juniper literary festival to the 50th anniversary of the publication of Some Trees.
In August 2007, Ashbery was named the first "Poet Laureate of MTVU". His poetry featured in short promotional videos on the network and its website. He accepted the unpaid position because he saw it as an opportunity to "broaden the audience for poetry" without expending much effort on his part. As he told the New York Times, MTVU were "going to publicize my poetry and maybe people will get interested in it and other poets will benefit," which was "about as much work or responsibility as I would want." The position endured after Ashbery's tenure: the Iranian poet Simin Behbahani was named the second Poet Laureate of MTVU in October 2009.
In October 2008, the nonprofit publisher Library of America issued Ashbery's Collected Poems 1956–1987 as volume 187 in its ongoing series of classic American literature, marking the first time it had published a volume of writing by a living poet.
In October 2011, Ashbery was named an LGBT History Month Icon. Beginning in 2006, the organization Equality Forum dedicated each day in October to honor an LGBT individual who had "changed the world in some way". Ashbery was recognized on October 2, 2011.
In November 2011, Ashbery was featured in the American LGBT culture magazine Outs 17th Annual Out100 list of 100 notable openly LGBT individuals.

All honors

Ashbery and the Nobel Prize in Literature

Ashbery never received the Nobel Prize in Literature, and a Nobel cannot be awarded posthumously. During his lifetime, he was a leading contender for the prize among American poets.

It is not known whether Ashbery was ever formally nominated for the prize or, if so, how many times he was nominated or how far he may have gotten in the process. Nomination records are kept secret for fifty years, after which time they may become available to the general public. Because he was last eligible for the prize in 2016, having died in 2017, records covering the full span of his eligibility will not be publicly available until at least 2067.

At the time of Ashbery's death, no writer had won the Nobel for literary work that is universally, uncontroversially recognized as "American poetry". Following Ashbery's death, New York Times critic Dwight Garner said the Nobel Committee's failure to recognize Ashbery ranked among its major oversights in American poetry, alongside its omissions of Elizabeth Bishop, Robert Frost, Wallace Stevens, Frank O'Hara, and John Berryman.

Though he never spoke of it publicly, there is some indication he contemplated winning the Nobel and hoped to achieve it.

Factors that may have affected Ashbery's odds to win the Nobel
Ashbery was the subject of public Nobel speculation as early as 1995, when Swedish publisher  dropped his name to the Associated Press as a candidate under discussion. Other members of the Swedish literati generally predicted a Nobel was due for a poet, a European, or possibly a European poet. Ultimately, Irish poet Seamus Heaney won that year.

Ladbrokes, a British betting and gambling company, has given odds for various potential candidates to win the Nobel in Literature every year since 2002. Ladbrokes' odds are regularly cited in the press, as Noble recipients are notoriously difficult to predict given the wide field of potential candidates, who are often obscure to the general public. Those odds placed him below E. L. Doctorow (at ), above Philip Roth and Maya Angelou (both at ), and on par with the Polish poet Adam Zagajewski.

Literary commentators believed Ashbery's Nobel prospects were boosted by his relative preeminence in his field. It stood to reason that if any poet—especially an American one—were to receive a Nobel in a given year, he would have been among the most probable choices. In 2008, David Orr wrote in The New York Times that, among American poets, only Ashbery and Adrienne Rich enjoyed "international reputations conceivably large enough to interest Nobel jurors" at that time. The same year, the Swedish scholar  commented that it had been a long time since a Nobel had gone to a poet—the last had been Heaney in 1995—and he named Ashbery, Adunis (a Syrian), and Les Murray (an Australian) as probable winners for poetry.

On the other hand, Ashbery's chances may have been dampened by his avant-garde style, which diverged from the universalism favored by the Nobel Committee. Ange Mlinko commented that  year that the Nobel committee passes over poet John Ashbery for a socially responsible novelist, it proves that the prize for literature is just an arm of the Peace Prize, rather than–like the Nobels for physics or chemistry–a prize for radical discovery in the field." According to Charles North, Ashbery was hindered because, "unlike most of those who have won the prize," he was "not perceived as engagé"—that is, he was not perceived to be seriously engaged as a writer with any pressing moral or political causes; nonetheless, North wrote, there was "no [other] writer whose poems are more engaged with what it means to be human." Jeffrey Gray claimed there is a symbolic expectation that a Nobel winner will embody their national literature, and Ashbery was not necessarily an obvious choice to represent American literature as a whole:

Ashbery was also openly gay, and his sexuality may have influenced Nobel deliberations. Alfred Corn, a gay American poet and friend of Ashbery, noted in an obituary for The Gay & Lesbian Review Worldwide that he had won "every prize you can think of except for the Nobel, which almost never goes to gay writers." Eileen Myles, an American writer and lesbian, suggested in Out magazine that Ashbery's heightened aestheticism and open homosexuality made him an improbable fit for the committee's restrained sensibilities:

Notes

Citations

Sources

Bibliography

Academic and literary journals

Magazines, newspapers and websites

Lists of awards received by writer